Canja de Goa (Goan soup) is a typical soup of the Indo-Portuguese cuisine of Goa, Daman and Diu, which once formed part of the Portuguese State of India, and is inspired by Portuguese soup.

It is prepared with chicken, local sausage, onion, garlic, rice, water and salt. All these ingredients are cooked together in a saucepan or in a pressure cooker. Finally, extract of chicken bones is added.

According to tradition, in Goa, it was made for women who gave birth in the family home. After the first birth, the mothers-in-law sent to the brides a bottle of port wine and six chickens, to be used in preparing the soup, since this was considered a good food for mothers and convalescents.

It is consumed around 11 am, together with curry from the previous day, sweet mango chutney and salted fish. Sometimes it is transported to the fields by children, in a vessel of clay, for their parents and older siblings working there.

See also

 List of soups

References

Indian soups and stews
Goan cuisine
Indian folklore
Indian fusion cuisine
Portuguese fusion cuisine